Khonjesht Rural District is a rural district (dehestan) in the Central District of Eqlid County, Fars Province, Iran. At the 2006 census, its population was 8,385, in 1,793 families.  The rural district has 14 villages.

References 

Rural Districts of Fars Province
Eqlid County